Nansha District is the municipal district of Sansha, Hainan. which governs the islands and reefs of the disputed Spratly Islands and their sea areas. The People's Government of Nansha District is located in Yongshu Reef (Nansha Management Area).

Administrative divisions

References

External links

Sansha
County-level divisions of Hainan